|}

This is a list of electoral region results for the Western Australian Legislative Council in the 1983 Western Australian state election.

Results by Electoral province

Central

Lower Central

Lower North 

 Preferences were not distributed.

Lower West

Metropolitan

North

North Central Metropolitan

North Metropolitan 

 Preferences were not distributed.

North-East Metropolitan 

 Preferences were not distributed.

South

South Central Metropolitan

South East

South East Metropolitan

South Metropolitan

South West

Upper West

West

See also 

 Results of the Western Australian state election, 1983 (Legislative Assembly)
 1983 Western Australian state election
 Candidates of the Western Australian state election, 1983
 Members of the Western Australian Legislative Council, 1983–1986

References 

Results of Western Australian elections
1983 elections in Australia